Nora's Ark is a 1948 German drama film directed by Werner Klingler that stars Willy Maertens, Claus Hofer and Harry Meyen.

It was produced by Wandsbek Studios in Hamburg in the British Zone of Occupation. The film's sets were designed by art director Herbert Kirchhoff.

Cast
 Willy Maertens as Willi Lüdecke
 Claus Hofer as Klaus Schriewer
 Harry Meyen as Peter Stoll
 Edith Schneider as Nora Wendler
 Peter Schütte as Jochen Wendler
 Johannes Billiam as Monteur
 Hans Billian
 Karl Kramer as Besitzer des Autofriedhofes
 Lieselotte Lütje as Sekretärin
 Marga Maasberg as Frau Jansen
 Kurt Meister as Radtke
 Ludwig Röger as Ein dicker Mann
 Sylvia Schwarz as Kind
 Willi Schweisguth as Arzt

References

Bibliography 
 Davidson, John & Hake, Sabine. Framing the Fifties: Cinema in a Divided Germany. Berghahn Books, 2007.

External links 
 

1948 films
West German films
German drama films
1948 drama films
1940s German-language films
Films directed by Werner Klingler
Films shot at Wandsbek Studios
Real Film films
German black-and-white films
1940s German films